William Stephenson (1888 – after 1921) was an English professional footballer who played in the Football League for Hull City as a right back.

Personal life 
Stephenson served as a private in the Football Battalion and the Queen's Regiment during the First World War.

Career statistics

References

1888 births
People from Whitburn, Tyne and Wear
Footballers from Tyne and Wear
Date of death missing
English footballers
Association football fullbacks
Jarrow F.C. players
Hull City A.F.C. players
Tottenham Hotspur F.C. players
Wingate Albion F.C. players
Hartlepool United F.C. players
English Football League players
British Army personnel of World War I
Middlesex Regiment soldiers

Shildon A.F.C. players